The Estadio Municipal de Los Pozos is the home stadium of both CD Unión Puerto and CD Herbania. It is situated in the Fuerteventura capital Puerto del Rosario. The ground seats 2,000 spectators.

External links
Estadios de España 

Football venues in the Canary Islands
Fuerteventura